Li Si (born 29 April 1976) is a Chinese former professional tennis player.

Known as "Bruce", Li played college tennis for Clemson University in the late 1990s. He was the tournament MVP when Clemson claimed the 1997 ACC championship.

Li twice featured in the doubles main draw at the Shanghai Open, including in 1999 when he and Yang Jingzhu lost in the first round to the world's top ranked pair, Mahesh Bhupathi and Leander Paes.

Between 1998 and 2001, Li was a member of the China Davis Cup team and featured in a total of four ties. He won the only singles rubber he played (against Aisam-ul-Haq Qureshi) and won two of his four doubles rubbers.

Li won bronze medals for China at both the 1998 Asian Games in Bangkok and 2001 Universiade in Beijing, for mixed doubles and men's doubles respectively.

References

External links
 
 
 

1976 births
Living people
Chinese male tennis players
Clemson Tigers men's tennis players
Tennis players at the 1998 Asian Games
Medalists at the 1998 Asian Games
Asian Games medalists in tennis
Asian Games bronze medalists for China
Universiade bronze medalists for China
Universiade medalists in tennis
Medalists at the 2001 Summer Universiade